Matías Héctor Sebastián Urbano (born 16 February 1981 in Cipolletti, Argentina) is a former Argentine footballer, who played as a striker.

Career
Urbano began his career in his hometown playing for Club Cipolletti. He made his debut in first division with Talleres de Córdoba in 2001. He later moved to Colombia where he played for Real Cartagena before migrating to Ecuador to make appearances in the Serie A for Macará and consequently Deportivo Quito. In his first return to Argentina, he signed for San Lorenzo de Almagro, but he was relegated to the bench, playing only in one league game for the cuervos. Struggling to get notice he finally decided to leave the club, and relocated to Mexico where he played for Club León during 2004 and Cruz Azul Oaxaca in 2005. His good performance awoke the interest of Chilean club Deportes La Serena, which signed him for the 2006 season. The following year, he continued playing in Chile for Everton.

In 2008, he transferred to Colombian team Cúcuta Deportivo where he also played in Copa Libertadores scoring 5 goals. In 2009 Urbano joined San Martín de Tucumán making his third spell in the Argentine Primera, but shortly after he joined the Italian team Aurora Pro Patria 1919.

Urbano earned global recognition after scoring a "rabona" goal against Unión La Calera. Six days after his extraordinary goal, he repeated the "rabona" shot, scoring this time against Deportes Iquique.

He retired in 2015.

References

External links
 
 Argentine Primera statistics at Fútbol XXI 

1981 births
Living people
People from Cipolletti
Argentine footballers
Association football forwards
Argentine Primera División players
Primera Nacional players
Torneo Argentino A players
Torneo Argentino B players
Club Cipolletti footballers
Almirante Brown de Arrecifes players
Talleres de Córdoba footballers
San Lorenzo de Almagro footballers
San Martín de Tucumán footballers
Sportivo y Biblioteca Atenas de Río Cuarto players
General Paz Juniors footballers
Categoría Primera A players
Real Cartagena footballers
Cúcuta Deportivo footballers
Millonarios F.C. players
Ecuadorian Serie A players
Ecuadorian Serie B players
C.S.D. Macará footballers
S.D. Quito footballers
Ascenso MX players
Club León footballers
Chilean Primera División players
Deportes La Serena footballers
Everton de Viña del Mar footballers
Santiago Morning footballers
Unión San Felipe footballers
Serie C players
Aurora Pro Patria 1919 players
Argentine expatriate footballers
Argentine expatriate sportspeople in Colombia
Argentine expatriate sportspeople in Ecuador
Argentine expatriate sportspeople in Chile
Argentine expatriate sportspeople in Mexico
Argentine expatriate sportspeople in Italy
Expatriate footballers in Colombia
Expatriate footballers in Ecuador
Expatriate footballers in Chile
Expatriate footballers in Mexico
Expatriate footballers in Italy